Dinko Felić (born 10 November 1983) is a Bosnian-born Norwegian footballer who plays for FC Linköping City as a forward.

Felić was born in Bosnia but his family relocated to Norway when he was twelve and settled down in Vågå. In 1999, he moved to Kongsvinger to attend a school which focused on football. There he also joined the local club Kongsvinger IL where he eventually played two seasons with the first team.

In 2004, he moved to Sweden where he signed for Enköpings SK who were playing in second tier Superettan at the time but was relegated that same year and Felić spent the remaining two seasons with the club in the Swedish third tier. During his years in Enköping he was often referred to as "The Zlatan Ibrahimović of Uppland".

Career statistics

References

External links

1983 births
Living people
Association football forwards
Norwegian footballers
Bosnia and Herzegovina emigrants to Norway
Kongsvinger IL Toppfotball players
Syrianska FC players
Allsvenskan players
Superettan players
Ettan Fotboll players
Norwegian expatriate footballers
Expatriate footballers in Sweden
Norwegian expatriate sportspeople in Sweden
FC Linköping City players